Cao Bằng is a city in northern Vietnam. It is the capital and largest settlement of Cao Bằng Province. According to the 2019 census, Cao Bằng City has a population of 73,549 people.

History
The area, Cao Bằng, was the stronghold of the last years of the Mạc dynasty after their 1592 defeat at the hands of the Trịnh lords. During the 19th century the area was resistant to the Nguyễn government.

The city is also known for the Battle of Cao Bằng, the first major decisive victory of the Việt Minh against the French Army.

During the sino-vietnamese war Cao Bằng fell for a limited time in chinese hands.

Climate

References 

Provincial capitals in Vietnam
Populated places in Cao Bằng province
Cities in Vietnam
Districts of Cao Bằng province